Between Night and Day (Spanish: Entre noche y día) is a 1932 British mystery film directed by Albert de Courville and Fernando Gomis. It was made at Walton Studios as the Spanish-language version of the British mystery film 77 Park Lane, which was based on the 1928 play by Walter C. Hackett. A separate French-language film 77 Rue Chalgrin was also released. Such multiple-language versions were common during the early years of sound. The only actor appearing in the film with a career in the English-speaking world was Helena D'Algy.

References

Bibliography 
 Low, Rachael. Filmmaking in 1930s Britain. George Allen & Unwin, 1985.

External links 
 

1932 films
1932 mystery films
British mystery films
1930s Spanish-language films
Films directed by Albert de Courville
British films based on plays
Films shot at Nettlefold Studios
British multilingual films
British black-and-white films
1932 multilingual films
1930s British films